Aspasia: The International Yearbook of Central, Eastern, and Southeastern European Women's and Gender History is an annual peer-reviewed academic journal covering research on women's and gender history in central, eastern, and southeastern Europe. Aspasia was founded in 2006 by Francisca de Haan at the Gender Studies Department of the Central European University.  In the first decade of its existence, the yearbook has become an important outlet for feminist research conducted by scholars from Central and Eastern Europe.  In addition to original research articles, the yearbook publishes forums on topics related to women’s and gender history, as well as numerous English book reviews of texts published in the languages of Central and Eastern Europe.

Abstracting and indexing 
The journal is indexed and abstracted in:

External links 
 

Gender studies journals
History journals
Publications established in 2007
English-language journals
Annual journals
Berghahn Books academic journals